The 2013 Abilene Christian Wildcats football team represented Abilene Christian University in the 2013 NCAA Division I FCS football season. Led by second-year head coach Ken Collums, the Wildcats compiled a record of 6–5. Abilene Christian played their home games at Shotwell Stadium  in Abilene, Texas.

Abilene Christian played their first transition season at the FCS level in 2013, however, they were not considered a FCS team for scheduling purposes until 2014 and were ineligible for the NCAA Division I Football Championship playoffs and the NCAA Division II Football Championship playoffs. They played a mixed schedule of teams from the NCAA Division I Football Bowl Subdivision (FBS), the NCAA Division I Football Championship Subdivision (FCS), NCAA Division II, and the National Association of Intercollegiate Athletics (NAIA). The Wildcats joined the Southland Conference for football in the 2014 season, which counted as the second year in a four-year transition into NCAA Division I. They became eligible for the FCS playoffs in 2017.

Schedule

* Games aired on tape delay

Coaching staff

Game summaries

Concordia (AL)

Sources:

McMurry

Sources:

New Mexico Highlands

Sources:

Illinois State

Sources:

Tarleton State

Sources:

Pittsburg State

Sources:

Houston Baptist

Sources:

Incarnate Word

Sources:

New Mexico State

Sources:

Incarnate Word
Sources:

Prairie View A&M

Sources:

Broadcasts
All Abilene Christian games were broadcast on KTLT, also known as Sports Radio 98.1 The Ticket, and in Dallas on KBXD as part of the Abilene Christian Wildcats Cumulus radio network.

Audio and video of all home games is being offered live through Stretch Internet via ACU TV. Audio of all road games is also available through ACU TV. Locally Wildcats home games are shown on KTES-LP This TV tape delayed Tuesday nights.

References

Abilene Christian
Abilene Christian Wildcats football seasons
Abilene Christian Wildcats football